John Wigan may refer to:
John Wigan (physician) (1696–1739), British physician, poet and medical author
John Tyson Wigan (1872–1952), British politician and army officer